Yagodnoye is an urban-type settlement in Magadan Oblast, Russia.  Population:

Geography
The settlement lies in the south-eastern section of the Chersky Range, on the left bank of the Debin, a tributary of the Kolyma.  The oblast capital of Magadan lies approximately 340 km to the south-east in a direct line, although it is over 550 km by road.

History
Yagodnoye was founded in 1934 in connection with the construction of the Kolyma Highway and the development of gold mining in the area.  The town's name is derived from the Russian word yagoda for berry. 

From 1949 until 1957, the settlement housed the administration of the SevLag forced labour camp in the Dalstroy section of the gulag network, where up to 15,800 prisoners were used in gold mining, road building and timber felling.

With the creation of Yagodninsky District in 1953, Yagodnoye received urban-type settlement status.

Economy and infrastructure
The main industry in the settlement remains gold mining, although this has declined significantly since the collapse of the Soviet Union.  Other industries such as production of food and construction materials also suffered as a result, meaning that a large proportion of the town's population has left since the 1990s.

Magadan can be reached via the Kolyma Highway, with branch roads leading to the former mining settlements of Verkhny At-Uryakh, Taskan and Elgen.

Notable residents
Diana Arbenina (*1974), singer from the band Nochniye Snaiperi, spent her childhood in Yagodnoye
Olga Pershina (*1955 in Yagodnoye), folk and rock musician, author
Varlam Shalamov (1907–1982), writer and Gulag survivor who spent over 15 years as a prisoner in the Kolyma region
Yuri Shevchuk (*1957 in Yagodnoye), singer and rock musician
Igor Vysotsky (*1953 in Yagodnoye), boxer

References

Urban-type settlements in Magadan Oblast